Seifhennersdorf is a town in the district Görlitz, in the Free State of Saxony, Germany. It is situated on the border with the Czech Republic, and the Czech towns of Rumburk and Varnsdorf lie across the border to the north-east and south of town.

Seifhennersdorf is 8 km south of Ebersbach and 14 km west of Zittau.

History

During World War II, a subcamp of Flossenbürg concentration camp was located in the town.

Notable people 
 Gottfried Grünewald (1673–1739), harpsichordist, opera singer and composer
 Rudolf Otto Neumann (1868-1952), hygienist and bacteriologist
 Bruno Paul (1874-1968), architect, illustrator,  interior designer, and furniture designer.
 Anna Strohsahl (1885-1953), politician, first female city councillor of Cuxhaven 
 Rica Reinisch (born 1965), Olympic swimmer

References

Towns in Görlitz (district)
Czech Republic–Germany border crossings